Zanclognatha zelleralis, the dusky fan-foot, is a species of moth of the family Noctuidae. It was described by Maximilian Ferdinand Wocke in 1850. It is found in central and southern Europe.

Technical description and variation

as Z. tarsicristalis H.-Sch. [synonym] Forewing greyer, less purple, than tarsiplumalis  the subterminal  better marked, bordered with dark on both sides; the outer line more dentate; the cell lunule ocellate;  the ab. zelleralis Wocke [synonym] from Silesia, has narrower wings with fainter markings. Larva greyish yellow, finely dusted with dark ; dorsal line reddish, swollen laterally at the hinder edge of the segments; the reddish subdorsal shewing on the front halves of each segment; the colour varies from grey to brown with the green of the inside showing through.

Biology
The moth flies from June to July depending on the location.

The larvae feed on fallen leaves.

References

External links

"08857 Zanclognatha zelleralis (Wocke, 1850) - Felsflur-Spannereule". Lepiforum e.V. Retrieved 31 January 2020. 

zelleralis
Moths of Europe
Taxa named by Maximilian Ferdinand Wocke
Moths described in 1850